Gia Maione Prima (May 20, 1941 – September 23, 2013) was an American singer and wife of singer Louis Prima.

Biography
Born in the Roebling section of Florence Township, New Jersey, Maione lived in Bordentown before moving with her family to Toms River, New Jersey. She was a 1959 graduate of Toms River High School (since renamed as Toms River High School South). 

Maione first gained notice in 1962, when she was signed to sing lead female vocals for Prima and his band. Prima had divorced Keely Smith, his former lead vocalist, the year before. Smith left the orchestra, creating the opening that Maione filled.

In 1963, she married Prima, becoming his fifth and final wife. She had two children with Prima, a daughter named Lena and a son named Louis Prima Jr.

In 1965, the couple recorded Let's Fly With Mary Poppins, a popular album containing jazz versions of songs from the popular Disney film. The couple routinely performed at locations such as the Copacabana, the Sahara Hotel, the Sands Hotel, and the Palmer House in Chicago. Although paired with Prima near the end of his career, Prima, Maione and orchestra remained extremely popular and sang to sold-out crowds up to 1975.

In 1975, while undergoing an operation in Los Angeles to remove a benign brain tumor, Prima lapsed into a coma and never regained consciousness. He died almost three years later on August 24, 1978 in his home town of New Orleans.

The Prima estate was tied up in litigation for almost 15 years following Prima's death. Louis left his wife Gia in debt, forced to sell off assets to appease his wives and biological children.  Gia was so impoverished, millions in debt to the medical institutions, she was sewing Lena and Louis Jr.'s clothing. In 1994, Maione assumed control of the Prima archives, at which time she set about managing his vast musical legacy. She dedicated herself to remastering and re-releasing Prima's work. Among her other duties, Maione handled the licensing of Prima's work for television, film and advertising, such as the use of 'Jump, Jive and Wail' for a series of Gap ads in the late 1990s. While living in Island Heights, New Jersey in 2002, she filed suit against Unidisc Music claiming that proper royalties had not been paid.

Until her death in 2013, Maione operated Prima Music, LLC, which releases previously unavailable Prima titles. The company also operates www.louisprima.com. She also stated that she had been interested in developing a Prima biopic. In a 2003 interview, she stated "In my opinion, there's only one person I believe could play Louis today. John Travolta. He has the rhythm, he's an Italian, and he has that devilish twinkle in his eye. The only thing he has to learn is the New Orleans flavor, and I know he could do that."

In 2004, Gia Maione was inducted into the Toms River Schools Hall of Fame.

Maione died in Pensacola, Florida, at the age of 72.

References

External links

American women singers
American people of Italian descent
American jazz singers
People from Bordentown, New Jersey
People from Florence Township, New Jersey
People from Island Heights, New Jersey
People from Toms River, New Jersey
1941 births
2013 deaths
American jazz musicians
Singers from New Jersey
Toms River High School South alumni
21st-century American women